Losaline Ma'asi is a Tongan politician, cabinet minister, and former member of the Legislative Assembly of Tonga for Tongatapu 5.

Ma'asi is a former chief executive of the Ministry of Agriculture. She was first elected to parliament in the 2017 election. On 26 June 2018 she was appointed Minister of Internal Affairs and Sports, replacing 'Akosita Lavulavu. In January 2019 a minor cabinet reshuffle saw her swap her Internal Affairs portfolio for Agriculture, Food, and Forests.

She contested the 2021 Tongan general election, but was unsuccessful.

References

Members of the Legislative Assembly of Tonga
Tongan women in politics
Women government ministers of Tonga
Government ministers of Tonga
Living people
21st-century women politicians
Year of birth missing (living people)
Female interior ministers
Democratic Party of the Friendly Islands politicians